Ronald Samuel Johnson (14 May 1949 – November 1998) was an English actor.

Biography 
Johnson was born in Gateshead. the son of Samuel Johnson and Thomasina (Tina) Scott. He was brother to Kenneth (who died in September 1964), Raymond (Jimmy) and two sisters Valerie and Catherine.

Johnson was raised in Gateshead and lived on the Springwell Estate. From an early age he was interested in music and played guitar, which he wore around his neck. Later he became a member of the band Pigmeat along with Jim Murray and Ray Stubbs. After playing bass guitar at Live Theatre in a panto he was asked to act in the show. He applied for Equity membership but they already had a 'Ron Johnson' so he used his father's name of 'Sammy'. He appeared in several TV productions and often worked with local writers like C. P. Taylor, Tom Hadaway, Leonard Barras and Arthur McKenzie but continued to be a musician with the 'Ray Stubbs R&B Allstars' as well as forming 'Matt Vinyl and the Decorators'.

Johnson was cast as Martin Cooper in the second series of Auf Wiedersehen, Pet. He was then chosen by Jimmy Nail to play 'Stick' in Spender, which was written by Jimmy Nail and Ian La Frenais. Other famous roles he played were in the animated comedy adaptation of VIZ's Sid the Sexist - where he provided the voice of the titular character and in ITV's adaptation of Catherine Cookson's The Gambling Man as Victor Pittie. He then turned to scriptwriting and moved to Spain in the hills above Málaga, where he died while out jogging in 1998 at the age of 49.

After his death, the Sammy Johnson Memorial Fund was set up. There is a biennial variety concert named Sunday for Sammy hosted by Tim Healy and (until 2008) Jimmy Nail, featuring sketches with North East personalities. Kevin Whately, Denise Welch and Peter Beardsley are amongst the regular contributors.

External links 
 
Sammy Johnson Memorial Fund
BBC Comedy Sammy Johnson

1949 births
1998 deaths
English male television actors
British expatriates in Spain
Male actors from Newcastle upon Tyne
Actors from County Durham
Actors from Gateshead
20th-century English male actors